The 1832 United States presidential election in New Hampshire took place between November 2 and December 5, 1832, as part of the 1832 United States presidential election. Voters chose seven representatives, or electors to the Electoral College, who voted for President and Vice President.

New Hampshire voted for the Democratic Party candidate, Andrew Jackson, over the National Republican candidate, Henry Clay. Jackson won New Hampshire by a margin of 13.52%.

Results

See also
 United States presidential elections in New Hampshire

References

New Hampshire
1832
1832 New Hampshire elections